Cobb County International Airport - McCollum Field  is a public airport located  northwest of the central business district of Atlanta, immediately south of the city of Kennesaw in Cobb County, Georgia, United States.  It operates 24 hours per day, although it is not controlled between the hours of midnight and 6:00 a.m. (EST/EDT).   It is also designated as a weather station.

Cobb Place is at the east end, with Cobb Parkway (U.S. 41) and old 41 intersecting McCollum Parkway on the west end. The airfield sits at 1,040 feet (317 m) above mean sea level somewhat above average terrain for the area. The airport has a control tower. The airport also has a restaurant built directly beside the runway called Elevation Chophouse & Skybar; patrons can watch aircraft take off and land from their tables.

The airport has approximately 358 aircraft based there: 251 single engine, 55 multi-engine, 39 jet aircraft and 13 helicopters.  49 percent of operations are single engine and 49 percent are multi-engine. Only 1 percent of operations are air taxi. No major commercial airlines service Cobb County Airport, but there are two charter companies and two major fixed-base operators. Aerial tours are very popular at the airport, largely because the scenic Appalachian Mountains are less than a 30-minute flight away.

McCollum Field is owned by Cobb County, operated by the County Department of Transportation, characterizing it as a municipal airport.  It is managed by a full-time, professional airport manager.   The airport employs almost 185 people, and had an annual economic impact of more than US$47 million to the local economy in 2002.

History 
McCollum Field opened in 1960 with a single 4,000-foot (1,219 m) runway. There was a stub taxiway connecting the runway with the ramp area, 60,000 square feet (5,570 m²) of aprons, and a single administration building. The airport steadily grew over the next 30 years with the greatest developments occurring in the early 1990s.

In 1991, the airport layout plan was first revised. The first full service fixed-base operator opened in 1992. A second full service fixed-base operator opened a year later. That same year, the Georgia State Patrol Hangar was constructed. The Air Traffic Control Tower was opened in 1995, followed by an Instrument Landing System glide slope the next year. Over the course of the decade, there were four major purchases of new land at a total cost of US$3.8 million in grants and an unspecified amount in local funds. In addition, 6 new hangars were built.

McCollum Field was first designed as a small field for general aviation. It is designated as a reliever airport for Hartsfield-Jackson Airport and DeKalb-Peachtree Airport. Cobb County is also the primary general aviation airport for the Atlanta suburban population. As of 2006, it is the third most trafficked airport in Georgia with an average of 475 takeoffs and landings each day.

2008 runway
The runway took 23 days to complete. During the runway construction of RWY "9-27" taxiway "A" was made temporary runway "8-26".

References

External links 
Cobb County Airport - McCollum Field
Atlanta Executive Jet Center
Preferred Jet Center
Aero Atlanta Flight Center

Airports in Georgia (U.S. state)
Airports established in 1960
Buildings and structures in Cobb County, Georgia
1960 establishments in Georgia (U.S. state)
Transportation in Cobb County, Georgia